Falcon is a southern suburb of Mandurah, located southwest of Mandurah's central area and with frontage to the Indian Ocean. The suburb was named after Falcon Bay. Falcon was approved as a suburb name on 13 November 1967 and gazetted on 8 March 1968. Many of the streets in the adjoining estate were named after yachts; "Falcon" itself was the name of a yacht, the crew of which won a silver medal in the 12m² Sharpie yacht races at the 1956 Melbourne Olympics.

Geography
Falcon is one of four Mandurah suburbs that lie on an island bound by the Mandurah Estuary to the north, the Peel-Harvey Estuary to the east, the Dawesville Channel to the south and the Indian Ocean to the west. It is also bisected by Old Coast Road, which connects Falcon to nearby Mandurah and Bunbury.

Falcon was formerly known as Miami, which is still used in the names of various buildings, including the multi-award winning Miami Bakehouse and Miami Plaza, which is home to a Woolworths supermarket and a large variety of fast food outlets.

Public transport
Falcon, like neighbouring suburbs Wannanup and Dawesville, is serviced by Transperth routes 592 and 594. 592 runs six days a week through Falcon via Galatea and Yeedong Roads while 594 goes straight through the suburb via Old Coast Road, but runs 7 days a week. Services generally run every twenty minutes during peak hour with 592 and 594 alternating every ten minutes in terms of departing Mandurah Station, with some school specials deviating from this normal pattern.

Stories of Local People & Places
• In 1950-53 Fernly Maidment bought property in Falcon. Fernly was one of a number of fishermen who went looking for the Presentation Sisters who drowned, along with a priest, heading back to Mandurah. He worked as an agent for Bassett Scarfe & Watson. Grandfather of current resident. He moved to Furnissdale in 1969.

• There is a capsized boat at the bottom of South East Dawesville Channel Estuary "Josephine" – it belonged to a Falcon resident's father who lived on the boat for many years. He also crewed on most boats at Royal Perth Yacht Club whose names are now Falcon street-names and he can remember them all.

• Local street names repeat some of the champion ocean and Swan River racing yachts, for example Panamuna Drive and Verona Crescent.

• Late 1950s/1960s Geary's beach surf break was named after Ray and Helen Geary's beach shack in Sandra Street. The boys would head over the back beach with their "planks" and drink beer at the shack afterwards.

• The first school with the City of Mandurah local government area boundary was built at Pleasant Grove in 1906, pre-dating the Central Mandurah public school on Hackett Street by 30 years. It closed in 1916.

• The first brick and tile houses in Falcon were built on Mercedes Avenue.

• In the late-90s, the band Turnstyle made several visits to Falcon to write music in solitude at the holiday home of guitarist Adem K on Philante Street. Most of the album Turnstyle Country was written here including the top 20 single "Spray Water on the Stereo" which directly references the home in its lyrics.

References

Suburbs of Mandurah